A somatic antigen is an antigen located in the cell wall of a gram-positive or gram-negative bacterium.

See also
 Lipopolysaccharide

References

Bacterial proteins
Bacteriology